Epica vs Attack on Titan Songs is the second EP by the Dutch symphonic metal band Epica, featuring covers of songs based on the anime Attack on Titan. The EP arranges selected songs originally written and composed by Revo of the Japanese band Linked Horizon with Epica's flair for heavy and massive-sounding songs with a classical motif. It was released on December 20, 2017 originally in Japan, and was released worldwide on July 20, 2018.

Background
In April 2017, Epica held a concert in Tokyo, Japan. After the concert, Revo, the leader of Linked Horizon who is also an Epica fan, went to their dressing room and asked them to make English-language covers for his songs. The band accepted his proposal then started the recording process in the summer of 2017 at the Sandlane Recording Facilities studio in The Netherlands. The tracks were adapted by Epica and produced by Joost van den Broek. The choir arrangements and scoring were completed by keyboardist Coen Janssen who also handled the orchestral arrangements with Joost van den Broek.

Track listing

Personnel
Credits for Epica vs Attack on Titan Songs adapted from liner notes.

Epica
 Simone Simons – lead vocals
 Isaac Delahaye – lead guitar, growled vocals
 Mark Jansen – rhythm guitar, growled vocals
 Rob van der Loo – bass
 Coen Janssen – keyboards, choir arrangements, orchestral arrangements, scoring
 Ariën van Weesenbeek – drums, growled vocals

Additional personnel
 Marcela Bovio – backing vocals
 Linda Janssen – backing vocals

Choir – Kamerkoor PA'dam 
 Maria van Nieukerken – choir director
 Aldona Bartnik, Alfrun Schmidt, Annemieke Klinkenberg-Nuijten, Dagmara Siuty, Gonnie van Heugten, Daan Verlaan, Henk Gunneman, Koert Braches, René Veen, Annette Stallinga, Annette Vermeulen, Coosje Schouten, Karen Langendonk, Angus van Grevenbroek, Jan Hoffmann, Job Hubatka, Peter Scheele

Production
 Joost van den Broek – engineering, editing, mixing, orchestral arrangements
 Darius van Helfteren – mastering
 Jos Driessen – engineering, editing
 Kenichi Suzuki – design
 Tim Tronckoe – photography
 Ben Mathot – scoring
 Robin Assen – scoring

Epica Orchestra

 Ben Mathot – violin
 Marleen Wester – violin
 Ian de Jong – violin
 Judith van Driel – violin
 Floortje Beljon – violin
 Loes Dooren – violin
 Laura van der Stoep – viola
 Frank Goossens – viola
 René van Munster – celli
 David Faber – celli
 Thijs Dapper – oboe
 Henk Veldt – French horn
 Alex Thyssen – French horn
 Paul Langerman – trombone
 Lennart de Winter – trombone
 Marnix Coster – trumpet
 Jurgen van Nijnatten – trumpet

Additional orchestra
 Jeroen Goossens – flutes, low whistle, clarinet, bassoon

Charts

See also
 "Jiyū e no Shingeki", original version of track 1–3.

References

2017 EPs
Epica (band) albums
Symphonic metal EPs
Attack on Titan